Try Whistling This is the debut solo album released in 1998 by New Zealand singer/songwriter Neil Finn. The Japanese version of the album has a bonus track called "Tokyo", which also appears on the UK release of the single "Sinner". Special editions of the Australian CD contained a bonus CD with six extra tracks which were used as the B-sides for the singles released from the album. The album topped the charts in Australia and New Zealand, and also reached the top five of the UK Albums Chart.

Awards
In 1999, Try Whistling This won the New Zealand Music Award for Best Cover Art. The cover was drawn by Neil's young son, Elroy.

Track listing
All songs were written by Neil Finn, except where noted.

 "Last One Standing" – 3:04
 "Souvenir" – 3:42
 "King Tide" (Finn, Robert Moore) – 4:33
 "Try Whistling This" (Finn, Jim Moginie) – 4:13
 "She Will Have Her Way" – 3:56
 "Sinner" (Finn, Marius De Vries) – 4:25
 "Twisty Bass" – 5:09
 "Loose Tongue" (Finn, Moginie) – 4:12
 "Truth" (Finn, Moginie) – 4:03
 "Astro" – 3:46
 "Dream Date" – 4:51
 "Faster Than Light" – 4:23
 "Addicted" – 4:22

Australian edition bonus disc
 "Tokyo" – 2:56
 "Family Ties" – 3:11
 "She Comes Scattered" – 3:36
 "Identical Twin" – 3:30
 "808 Song" – 3:30
 "Log Drums" – 3:49

Personnel
Tony Allen – drums (track 11)
Michael Barker – drums (tracks 3, 5, 6, 10), percussion (tracks 5, 6, 7, 8, 11)
Lyn Buchannan – additional drums (track 1)
Marius De Vries – programming (tracks 2, 3, 5, 6, 7, 8, 11, 13), keyboards (tracks 6 and 13)
Liam Finn – drums (tracks 2, 8), guitar (track 5)
Paddy Free – programming (track 7)
Mitchell Froom – Hammond (tracks 10, 11, 12)
Jim Moginie – guitars (tracks 4, 8, 10, 13), bass guitar (track 13), omnichord (track 13), percussion (track 13)
Robert Moore – bass (track 8)
Sebastian Steinberg – bass (tracks 1 to 6, 8, 9, 11)
Pete Thomas – drums (tracks 1, 4, 9)
Neil Finn – all other instruments

Charts

Weekly charts

Year-end charts

Certifications

References

Neil Finn albums
1998 debut albums
Albums produced by Tchad Blake
Albums produced by Marius de Vries
Parlophone albums